Eagle Peak is a mountain in Catron County, New Mexico, near the town of Reserve. The summit is the highest point in the Tularosa Mountains.

References

External links
 

Landforms of Catron County, New Mexico
Mountains of New Mexico
Mountains of Catron County, New Mexico